Alô, Doçura! is a Brazilian television series created by Cassiano Gabus Mendes and aired by TV Tupi (1953–1964). It was based on the American series I Love Lucy.

Cast
Eva Wilma
John Herbert
Mário Sérgio
Marly Bueno
Luis Gustavo
Yoná Magalhães
Marisa Prado

References

1960s Brazilian television series
Brazilian comedy television series
1953 Brazilian television series debuts
1964 Brazilian television series endings
Portuguese-language television shows
I Love Lucy